Broadview station is a former railway station in Broadview, Saskatchewan, Canada. The building was constructed by Canadian Pacific Railway in 1913. The one story, brick railway station is of a  Romanesque Revival style. It was built along the CP transcontinental mainline; the station also served as a division point on the railway.
The building was designated a historic railway station in 1992.

See also
 List of designated heritage railway stations of Canada

References 

Designated Heritage Railway Stations in Saskatchewan
Canadian Pacific Railway stations in Saskatchewan
Railway stations in Canada opened in 1913
Disused railway stations in Canada
1913 establishments in Saskatchewan